John Bull was Archdeacon of Cornwall, then Barnstaple in the first half of the nineteenth century.

References

Archdeacons of Barnstaple
19th-century English Anglican priests